Sinclair may refer to:

Places 
 Lake Sinclair, near Milledgeville, Georgia
 Sinclair, Iowa
 Sinclair, West Virginia
 Sinclair, Wyoming
 Sinclair Mills, British Columbia
 Sinclair Township, Minnesota
 Sinclair, Manitoba

People 
 Sinclair (surname), list of people with this surname
 Clan Sinclair, Scottish family
 Lord Sinclair, a title in the Peerage of Scotland
 Sinclair Lewis (1885–1951), Nobel Prize-winning American writer
 Sinclair (singer), stage name of French singer-songwriter Mathieu Blanc-Francard (born 1970)
 Sir Clive Sinclair, an English entrepreneur and inventor, most commonly known for his work in consumer electronics in the late 1970s and early 1980s - including ZX Spectrum computers.

Companies 
 Sinclair Broadcast Group, operator of American television stations
 Sinclair Oil Corporation, American petroleum company
 Sinclair Radionics Ltd, British electronics company founded in 1961
 Sinclair Research Ltd, British consumer electronics company founded in 1973, and the successor to Sinclair Radionics.

Schools 
 Sinclair (high school), Uddevalla, Sweden
 Sinclair Community College, Dayton, Ohio, U.S.
 Sinclair Secondary School, Ontario, Canada

Highways 
 Sinclair Freeway (Interstate 680)

Transportation 
 USS Sinclair (DD-275), a United States Navy destroyer named for Captain Arthur Sinclair
 Sinclair C5, a one-person battery electric velomobile

Fictional characters 
 Augustus Sinclair, a character in the 2010 video game BioShock 2
 Jeffrey Sinclair, a character from US TV series Babylon 5
 Lord Brett Sinclair from the 1971 TV series The Persuaders!
 Synclaire James, a character in the 1993 Fox network sitcom Living Single
 Rahne Sinclair, a mutant superhero from Marvel Comics
 Helga Sinclair, a character in the 2001 Disney animated sci-fi movie Atlantis: The Lost Empire
 Skylar Sinclair, a character in the 2009 video game The Saboteur
 Lucas Sinclair, a character in the 2016 Netflix series Stranger Things
 Ryan Sinclair, a companion in series 11 and 12 of BBC series Doctor Who
 the Sinclair family, protagonists in ABC's Dinosaurs (TV series)
 Enid Sinclair, a character in the 2022 Netflix series Wednesday
 Emil Sinclair, protagonist in the 1919 novel Demian
 Emil Sinclair, a character in the 2023 video game Limbus Company

See also 
 Saint Clair (disambiguation)
 Saint Clare (disambiguation)
 Santa Clara (disambiguation)
 Bob Sinclar (born 1969), French record producer and DJ
 Sinclaire
 Sinckler